The 1984 Orlando mayoral election was held on September 4, 1984 to elect the mayor of Orlando, Florida. It saw the reelection of Bill Frederick.

Municipal elections in Orlando and Orange County are non-partisan.

Results

References

1984
1984 Florida elections
1984 United States mayoral elections
1980s in Orlando, Florida
September 1984 events in the United States